Vice Admiral Sir John Wilson Cuthbert KBE CB DL (9 April 1902 – 7 December 1987) was a Royal Navy officer who became Flag Officer, Scotland and Northern Ireland.

Naval career
Cuthbert joined the Royal Navy as a midshipman in 1919. He served in World War II as Commanding Officer of the cruiser HMS Glasgow, as a member of the Joint Planning Staff at the British Admiralty and then as Commanding Officer of the cruiser HMS Ajax. After the War he was appointed Commanding Officer of the aircraft carrier  and then Deputy Controller at the Admiralty. He was made Flag Officer Flotillas for the Home Fleet in 1953 and Admiral commanding the Reserves in 1955 before becoming Flag Officer, Scotland and Northern Ireland in 1956 and retiring in 1958.

He lived at Hurstbourne Tarrant in Hampshire and was a deputy lieutenant of Hampshire.

Family
In 1928 he married Betty Wake Shorrock; they had no children.

References

1902 births
1987 deaths
Royal Navy vice admirals
Knights Commander of the Order of the British Empire
Companions of the Order of the Bath